Indradhanura Chhai is a 1993 Indian Oriya film directed by Susant Misra. This film reflects  the traditional structures of social and family life of a small town in India are growing strongly affected by the progressive urbanization of the country.  Three generations of women see their perception of human nature to evolve, as their personal relationships.  In their loneliness, they face problems of tradition, culture, religion and manage gender relations.  Gradual urbanization and its consequences affect the traditional, social and family structures in a growing small town in India.  The story explores the multidimensional conflicts of three women of different generations, their changing perceptions about human nature and personal relationships.  Their lonely moments are highlighted in the context of the inexorable flow of time amidst issues of tradition, culture, religion and man-woman relationships.

Synopsis 
The film looks at the lives of three women living in Bhubaneshwar. Vijaya's husband died a few days after their wedding and she is trying to cope with her feelings for a kind, local teacher. Her friend, Sonia, is caught between modernity and traditional notions of female virtue while Aunt Nila has difficulty in facing up to getting old.

Cast
Robin Das as Pratap
Vijayani Mishra as  Vijaya
Sonia Mohapatra  as Sonia
Surya Mohanty as Sales Representative
Deba Das as Deb
Muktabala Rautray as Widow
Anjana Chowdhury

Crew 
Susant Misra - Director
Susant Misra - Story & Screenplay
Jugala Debata -   Producer
Chakradhar Sahu - Editor
Devdas Chhotray - Dialogue
Jugala Debata - Director of Photography 
Vikash Das - Music
Asim Basu - Art Director
Himanshu Shekhar Khatur - Sound

Music 
Vikash Das has arranged music for this film

Review
Susant Mishra's Indradhanura Chhai (Shadows of the Rainbow ) shows how urbanization and the consequent rise of modern consumerism have affected the traditional social and family structures in Bhubaneswar. Against the backdrop of this changing cityscape, Indradhanura Chhai explores the multidimensional conflicts of its characters, their changing perceptions about human nature and personal relationships. With hypnotic visual rhythms, Susant Mishra shows the lives of three women living in the modernizing town of Bhubaneswar, its skyline dominated by magnificent temple architecture.

Awards & participation
Sochi International Film Festival, Russia( 1995) -Grand Prix for the Best Feature Film 
National Film Awards, India(1994) -Special Jury award
Cannes Film Festival, (1995) - Official Selection in Un Certain Regard
Orissa State Film Awards, (1994) - Best Direction, Best Dialogues & Screenplay, Best Supporting Actress and Special Jury Award 
Cairo International Film Festival 
Rotterdam International Film Festival
Moscow International Film Festival
International Film Festival for Nouveau Cinema, Montreal
Festival at Institute Lumiere, Paris
Screened as the Closing Film of the Indomania "100 Years of Indian Cinema" Celebration in Paris
1st Bhubaneswar Film Festival

References

External links
Data base of 'Indradhanura Chhai' in nfaipune.nic.in
Review of 'Indradhanura Chhai' in upperstall.com
Review of 'Indradhanura Chhai ' in movies.nytimes.com
Review of 'Indradhanura Chhai''' in www.cinema.nl
Casting & Crew of 'Indradhanura Chhai' in www.citwf.com
Casting & Crew of 'Indradhanura Chhai' in ftvdb.bfi.org.uk
 

1993 films
1993 drama films
Films set in Odisha
Special Mention (feature film) National Film Award winners
1990s Odia-language films
Indian drama films